Diego Assis may refer to:
 Diego Assis (footballer, born 1987), Brazilian footballer
 Diego Assis (footballer, born 1994), Brazilian footballer